Harriet Stewart may refer to:

 Harriet Stewart, Countess of Galloway (1811–1885)
 Harriet Bradford Tiffany Stewart (1798–1830), American missionary to the Sandwich Islands